Waldemar Gurian (February 13, 1902 – May 26, 1954) was a Russian-born German-American political scientist, author, and professor at the University of Notre Dame. He is regarded particularly as a theorist of totalitarianism. He wrote widely on  political Catholicism.

Gurian was born into an Armenian-Jewish family in 1902 in St. Petersburg, Russia, and was brought to Germany in 1911 by his mother, who had him christened in 1914 as a Catholic. He studied with political philosopher Carl Schmitt at the University of Bonn but disagreed on issues of political theology. In 1939 after escaping Nazi Germany Gurian took a professorship at Notre Dame, where Gurian founded The Review of Politics. The quarterly scholarly journal was modeled after German Catholic journals. It quickly emerged as part of an international Catholic intellectual revival, offering an alternative vision to positivist philosophy. For 44 years, the Review was edited by Gurian, Matthew Fitzsimons, Frederick Crosson, and Thomas Stritch. Intellectual leaders included Gurian, Jacques Maritain, Frank O'Malley, Leo Richard Ward, F. A. Hermens, and John U. Nef. It became a major forum for political ideas and modern political concerns, especially from a Catholic and scholastic tradition.

Selected bibliography 
For a complete list, see B. Szczesniak,  "Select Bibliography of Waldemar Gurian." The Review of Politics 17.01 (1955): 80-81.
 The political system of Alexander Hamilton, 1789–1804, 1929.
 The political and social ideas of French Catholicism, 1789-1914, 1929.
 The integral nationalism in France: Charles Maurras and the Action Française, 1931.
 Bolshevism: Theory and Practice, New York, Macmillan, 1932.
 Hitler and the Christians. Studies in Fascism: Ideology and Practice, AMS Press, 1936, 175 p.
 The Future of Bolshevism, Sheed & Ward, 1936, 125 p.
 The Rise and Decline of Marxism, Oates & Washbourne, 1938, 184 p.
 Russia and the Peace, 1945.
 Soviet Russia: A University of Notre Dame Symposium, University of Notre Dame, 1950.
 "The Development of the Soviet Regime: From Lenin to Stalin", The Soviet Union: Background, Ideology, Reality, University of Notre Dame Press, 1951.
 Bolshevism: An Introduction to Soviet Communism, University of Notre Dame Press, 1952.
 Soviet Imperialism: Its Origins and Tactics, a Symposium, (ed.), University of Notre Dame Press, 1953.
 The Catholic Church in World Affairs (with M. A. Fitzsimons), University of Notre Dame Press, 1954, 420 p.
 "Totalitarianism as Political Religion", Totalitarianism, New York, Grosset & Dunlap, 1964.

Notes

Further reading
 Arendt, Hannah. "The Personality of Waldemar Gurian." The Review of Politics 17.01 (1955): 33-42.  in JSTOR
 Hürten, Heinz. "Waldemar Gurian and the Development of the Concept of Totalitarianism."  Totalitarianism and Political Religions 1 (2004): 42-52.
 Kohn, Hans. "Waldemar Gurian: Witness of the Twentieth Century." The Review of Politics 17.01 (1955): 73-79.   in JSTOR
 Mosely, Philip E. "Waldemar Gurian and Russian Studies in America." The Review of Politics 17.01 (1955): 44-46.   in JSTOR
 O'Malley, Frank. "Waldemar Gurian at Notre Dame." The Review of Politics 17.01 (1955): 19-23.   in JSTOR
 Schneck, Stephen F. "Waldemar Gurian: Rediscovered," The Review of Politics 74#4 (2012), pp. 685–689. in JSTOR
 Thümmler, Ellen. "Totalitarian Ideology and Power Conflicts—Waldemar Gurian as International Relations Analyst after the Second World War." in  Felix Roesch, ed., Émigré Scholars and the Genesis of International Relations (Palgrave Macmillan UK, 2014) pp. 132–153.

American political scientists
German political scientists
American anti-fascists
German anti-fascists
American Roman Catholics
German Roman Catholics
Emigrants from Nazi Germany to the United States
Converts to Roman Catholicism from Judaism
American people of Russian-Jewish descent
1902 births
1954 deaths
Emigrants from the Russian Empire to Germany
German emigrants to the United States
20th-century political scientists